In the run up to the 2023 Estonian parliamentary election, various organisations carried out opinion polling to gauge voting intention in Estonia. The date range for these opinion polls are from the 2019 Estonian parliamentary election held on 3 March. Poll results are listed in the table below in reverse chronological order, showing the most recent first. The highest percentage figure in each poll is displayed in bold, and the background shaded in the leading party's colour. In the instance that there is a tie, then no figure is shaded.

Graphical summary

Polling results

2023

2022

2021

2020

2019

Notes

References

Opinion polling in Estonia